The olive bushshrike (Chlorophoneus olivaceus) is a species of bird in the family Malaconotidae.
It is found in Malawi, Mozambique, South Africa, Eswatini, and Zimbabwe.
Its natural habitats are subtropical or tropical dry forest, subtropical or tropical moist lowland forest, subtropical or tropical moist montane forest, and subtropical or tropical dry shrubland.

References

External links
 Olive Bushshrike - Species text in The Atlas of Southern African Birds.

olive bushshrike
Birds of Southern Africa
olive bushshrike
Taxonomy articles created by Polbot